Vunukuru Assembly constituency was an assembly constituency of the Andhra Pradesh Legislative Assembly, India. It was one of 10 constituencies in the Srikakulam district.

Overview
It was part of the Srikakulam Lok Sabha constituency along with another six Vidhan Sabha segments, namely, Palasa, Tekkali, Ichchapuram, Pathapatnam, Srikakulam and Narasannapeta.

Members of Legislative Assembly

See also
 List of constituencies of Andhra Pradesh Legislative Assembly

References

Former assembly constituencies of Andhra Pradesh